UK garage, abbreviated as UKG, is a genre of electronic dance music which originated in England in the early to mid-1990s. The genre was most clearly inspired by garage house, but also incorporates elements from dance-pop, R&B, and jungle. It is defined by percussive, shuffled rhythms with syncopated hi-hats, cymbals, and snares, and may include either 4/4 house kick patterns or more irregular "2-step" rhythms. Garage tracks also commonly feature 'chopped up' and time-stretched or pitch-shifted vocal samples complementing the underlying rhythmic structure at a tempo usually around 130 BPM.

UK garage encompassed subgenres such as speed garage and 2-step, and was then largely subsumed into other styles of music and production in the mid-2000s, including bassline, grime, and dubstep. The decline of UK garage during the mid-2000s saw the birth of UK funky, which is closely related.

Origins
The evolution of house music in the United Kingdom in the early to mid-1990s led to the term, as previously coined by the Paradise Garage DJs, being applied to a new form of music known as speed garage. In the early '90s, American DJ Todd Edwards, a pioneer of the speed garage sound, began remixing more soulful house records and incorporating more time-shifts and vocal samples than normal house records, whilst still living in the US. However, it was not until DJ EZ, the North London DJ, acquired one of Edwards' tracks and played it at a faster tempo in a nightclub in Greenwich, that the music genre really took off.

MJ Cole once stated, "London is a multicultural city... it's like a melting pot of young people, and that's reflected in the music of UK garage."

History

Relationship with jungle
In the United Kingdom, where jungle was very popular at the time, garage was played in a second room at jungle events. After jungle's peak in cultural significance, it had turned towards a harsher, more techstep influenced sound, driving away dancers, predominantly women. Escaping the 170bpm jungle basslines, the garage rooms had a much more sensual and soulful sound at 130bpm.

DJs started to speed up garage tracks to make them more suitable for the jungle audience in the UK. The media started to call this tempo-altered type of garage music "speed garage", 4x4 and 2-step's predecessor. DJs would usually play dub versions (arrangements without vocals) of garage tracks, because pitch-shifting vocals could sometimes render the music unrecognizable (although sped up and time-stretched vocals were an important part of the early jungle sound, and later played a key role in speed garage). The absence of vocals left space in the music for MCs, who started rhyming to the records.

Role of MCs
Since then, MCs have become one of the vital aspects of speed and UK garage parties and records. Early promoters of speed garage included the Dreem Teem and Tuff Jam, and pirate radio stations such as London Underground, Magic FM, Upfront FM, and Freek FM. During its initial phase, the speed garage scene was also known as "the Sunday Scene", as initially speed garage promoters could only hire venues on Sunday evenings (venue owners preferred to save Friday and Saturday nights for more popular musical styles). Labels whose outputs would become synonymous with the emerging speed garage sound included Confetti, Public Demand, 500 Rekords, Spread Love and VIP.

Speed garage
Speed garage already incorporated many aspects of today's UK garage sound like sub-bass lines, ragga vocals, spin backs and reversed drums. What changed over time, until the so-called 2-step sound emerged, was the addition of further funky elements like contemporary R&B styled vocals, more shuffled beats and a different drum pattern. The most radical change from speed garage to 2-step was the removal of the 2nd and 4th bass kick from each bar. Although tracks with only two kick drum beats to a bar are perceived as being slower than the traditional four-to-the-floor beat, the listener's interest is maintained by the introduction of syncopating bass lines and the percussive use of other instruments such as pads and strings.

Speed garage tracks were characterised by a sped-up house-style beat, complemented by the rolling snares and reverse-warped basslines that were popular with drum and bass producers of the time.

Among those credited with honing the speed garage sound, Todd Edwards is often cited as a seminal influence on the UK garage sound. The producer from New Jersey introduced a new way of working with vocals. Instead of having full verses and choruses, he picked out vocal phrases and played them like an instrument, using sampling technology. Often, individual syllables were reversed or pitch-shifted. This type of vocal treatment is still a key characteristic of the UK garage style. Armand van Helden's speed garage remix of Sneaker Pimps' "Spin Spin Sugar" in 1997 further popularized the genre which is sometimes credited with breaking speed garage into the mainstream. Another van Helden remix which also proved popular is his Drum 'n' Bass Mix of CJ Bolland's "Sugar Is Sweeter". Huge club hits in 1997 came from speed garage duos Double 99, 187 Lockdown and Industry Standard. The former two both scored UK top 20 hits in 1997 and 1998; Double 99's "RipGroove" reached #14 in its second release and 187 Lockdown's "Gunman" and "Kung-Fu" reached #16 and #9, respectively. Industry Standard scored a top 40 hit with "Vol. 1 (What You Want What You Need)" peaking at #34 in January 1998, and the 1997 XL Recordings release of Somore featuring Damon Trueitt's "I Refuse (What You Want)" reached #21 also in January 1998, containing mixes by Industry Standard, Ramsey & Fen, R.I.P. Productions and Serious Danger. The Fabulous Baker Boys scored a #34 hit in 1997 with "Oh Boy" which samples Jonny L's 1992 rave track "Hurt You So".

Two-step (1997–1999)
Arguably one of the earliest examples of a 2-step track is the 1997 Kelly G remix of "Never Gonna Let You Go" by Tina Moore, which peaked at #7 on the UK chart. Roy Davis Jr. was also influential in the UK garage scene, with the huge club hit "Gabriel" featuring Peven Everett, released in 1997 on XL Recordings and reaching #22 on the UK chart. Lovestation released their version of "Teardrops" which reached #14 in 1998. Doolally, the former name of Shanks & Bigfoot, scored a #20 hit in 1998 with "Straight from the Heart". A re-release of this song the following year fared even better, peaking at #9, due to the success of their #1 single "Sweet Like Chocolate". Jess Jackson was responsible for many garage records but one which stood out was "Hobson's Choice". The B-side of this record changed the UK garage scene from funky and soulful to dark and bassy. Another example of the evolution in 2-step was the release of "Troublesome" in 1999 by Shy Cookie and DJ Luck, in which non-sampled 2-step beats were merged with a full ragga vocal (performed by ragga artist Troublesome).

The UK's counterpart to Todd Edwards was MJ Cole, a classically trained oboe and piano player, who had a string of chart and underground hits in the late 1990s and early 2000s, most notably with "Sincere" and "Crazy Love". MJ Cole has also won a BBC "Young Musician of the Year" award.

American influences
Timbaland, a popular contemporary R&B producer in America, was the major innovator behind contemporary R&B at the time, from which UK rave culture borrowed heavily. The use of rhythmic patterns as melodic hooks is shared by both contemporary R&B and jungle, making it very appealing to the significantly ex-junglist UK garage scene. This style of Timbaland's R&B possesses a breakbeat aesthetic: breakup of the flow of four-to-the-floor rhythm, hesitations into the groove, and teasing and tantalizing gaps. As much as these R&B influences can be heard in early UK garage, the genre offered more complex drum beats, with heavy syncopation (swing) and a more energetic feel due to a higher tempo (normally between 130 and 138 BPM). However, in tracks like "Twentyfourseven" by Artful Dodger, a slower and simpler R&B infused drum pattern can be heard. This was to allow for these tracks to be aimed at a more commercial scene rather than for the dance floor. Garage producers then proceeded to churn out UK versions of US contemporary R&B hits, notably with Brandy and Monica's "The Boy Is Mine". The Architechs sped up the vocals through time-stretching and added sound effects to increase the competitive nature. "B&M Remix" eventually sold twenty thousand copies as a bootleg.

Also borrowed from US contemporary R&B is the use of "vocal science", the technique of digitally altering vocal samples with devices such as the Autotuner. What results is a mix between natural voice and technology.

1999–2000: Role of pirate radio, UK chart success
With the continued support of pirate radio stations such as Rinse FM, Ice FM, Deja Vu, and Flex FM, the soaring popularity of UK garage saw 1999 take the genre into the mainstream, breaking into the music charts. Production duos Shanks & Bigfoot and Artful Dodger were very successful with the tracks "Sweet Like Chocolate" (the first UK garage track to hit number one in the UK) and "Re-Rewind", respectively. After the platinum-selling success of "Sweet Like Chocolate", the floodgates had opened. Although "Re-Rewind" was denied a #1 position by Cliff Richard and his song "The Millennium Prayer", it was also a platinum seller, one of the garage scene's first and last. They became anthems for the 2-step scene, and got onto BBC's Top of the Pops. Other huge hits in 1999 include the #1 house/garage anthem "You Don't Know Me" by Armand van Helden. Although not UK garage, Mr. Oizo's #1 single "Flat Beat" received extensive airplay on pirate radio stations upon release, becoming a staple for house, breakbeat and UK garage DJs; thus leading to numerous UK garage/2-step remixes/bootlegs of the track. Da Click (Pied Piper, MC Creed, PSG, Unknown MC and singer Valerie M) had a #14 hit with "Good Rhymes". Garage trio the Dreem Teem had a #15 hit with "Buddy X 99", a garage remix of Neneh Cherry's 1992 song "Buddy X". DJ Luck & MC Neat also had a chart hit with "A Little Bit of Luck" in late 1999 into early 2000.

Many more UK garage acts followed into the new millennium by releasing commercially successful singles, thus making UK garage and 2-step a stable fixture on the UK charts for the next couple of years. Debut singles of various UK garage artists were hitting the number one spot on the UK charts. Craig David's debut solo single "Fill Me In", a mix of R&B and 2-step, with single formats containing various garage remixes of the track, hit #1 in April 2000. A month later, Oxide & Neutrino's "Bound 4 Da Reload (Casualty)" reached the top of the charts. Other top 10 hits in 2000 include Artful Dodger's "Movin' Too Fast" (#2), "Woman Trouble" (#6) and "Please Don't Turn Me On" (#4), Sweet Female Attitude's "Flowers" (#2), True Steppers' "Buggin" (#6) and "Out of Your Mind" (#2), B-15 Project's "Girls Like Us" (#7), DJ Luck & MC Neat's "Masterblaster 2000" (#5) and "Ain't No Stoppin' Us" (#8), MJ Cole's "Crazy Love" (#10), Wookie's "Battle" (#10), Lonyo's "Summer of Love" (#8), Architechs' "Body Groove" (#3), and Oxide & Neutrino's "No Good 4 Me" (#6). Another huge hit in 2000 was the Timo Maas remix of the song "Dooms Night" (#8) by German producer Azzido Da Bass, which was heavily associated with UK garage at the time, having become a major club hit and appearing on several UK garage compilations. It was also remixed by garage duo Stanton Warriors, titled "Dooms Night (Revisited)".

2001 hits
2001 gave DJ Pied Piper and the Masters of Ceremonies their one and only number one hit record with "Do You Really Like It?". Two months later in August 2001, South London collective So Solid Crew hit the top spot with their second single "21 Seconds". The end of 2001 saw yet another 2-step anthem reach the top of the UK charts for Daniel Bedingfield, with his debut single "Gotta Get Thru This". Other top 10 hits in 2001 include the Sunship mixes of Mis-Teeq's "Why" (#8), "All I Want" (#2) and "One Night Stand" (#5), Artful Dodger's "TwentyFourSeven" (#6), Liberty's "Thinking It Over" (#5), Oxide & Neutrino's "Up Middle Finger" (#7), and So Solid Crew's "They Don't Know" (#3).

2002: 2-step and grime
2002 saw an evolution as 2-step moved away from its funky and soul-oriented sound into a darker direction called "grime", now a genre in its own right. During this period, traditional UK garage was pushed back underground amongst the bad publicity emanating from the tougher side of the genre, and publicised violence surrounding members of the So Solid Crew. Nonetheless, several UK garage songs did appear on the charts from 2002 to 2004, including Heartless Crew's "The Heartless Theme" (#21), Distant Soundz' version of "Time After Time" (#20), So Solid Crew's "Ride wid Us" (#19) and "Haters" (#8), Ladies First's version of "I Can't Wait" (#19), Pay As U Go's "Champagne Dance" (#13), Mr Reds vs DJ Skribble's "Everybody Come On (Can U Feel It)" (#13), Mis-Teeq's "B with Me" (#5), Jaimeson's "True" (#4) and 3 of a Kind's "Baby Cakes" which was a number one hit in August 2004.

Notable early grime artists around 2001–03 include Ruff Sqwad, More Fire Crew, Dizzee Rascal (who released his debut album Boy in da Corner in 2003), Roll Deep, and Wiley.

During this time, there was also a strong division of class in UK garage. In the heyday of garage, the late 1990s, it was a highly aspirational genre. When people went to the club to hear garage, they dressed stylish and smart. Clubs such as Twice as Nice enforced a dress code of no tennis shoes, jeans, or baseball caps. Having a formal dress code changed the importance placed on nice clothes from a style to excluding people. The dress codes were meant to "encourage people to make an effort", but also to "keep trouble out." In time, the club installed a metal detector, because "gangstas like to dress expensive," but theoretically could still carry a gun. Eventually, when groups like So Solid Crew attracted more urban, lower-class audiences to raves because of their lyrics over the garage tracks, garage began to transition to grime because previous audiences were less likely to listen, so radios and clubs stopped giving garage opportunities.

2007: Garage revival
In 2007, several DJs helped promote and revive UK garage's popularity, with producers creating new UK garage, also known as "new skool" UK garage or "bassline".

The end of 2007 saw "new skool" UK garage push to the mainstream again with notable tracks such as T2's "Heartbroken" and H "Two" O's "What's It Gonna Be" both reaching the mainstream charts. The revival was galvanised by DJ EZ releasing Pure Garage Rewind: Back to the Old Skool, which contained three CDs of "old skool" UK garage and a fourth CD with fresh "new skool" UK garage.

2010s resurgence
Early 2011 saw the start of a gradual resurgence of 2-step garage. Producers such as Wookie, MJ Cole, Zed Bias and Mark Hill (formerly one half of Artful Dodger) made a return to the scene, by producing tracks with more of a 2-step feel. Electronic music duos Disclosure and AlunaGeorge, both successful throughout 2012 and 2013, often use elements of UK garage in their music, and arguably, some of their biggest hits including "You & Me" and "We Are Chosen" respectively, are entirely 2-step with an updated cleaner sound. Shortly following this, "original" style garage had made a return in a big way, with producers such as Moony, DJD and Tuff Culture paving the way. One of the genre's pioneering labels, Ice Cream Records, responsible for anthems such as "RipGroove", True Steppers' "Out of Your Mind", Kele Le Roc's "My Love" and more, opened up their permanent roster for the first time to include DJs outside of the legendary trio that launched the label.

AJ Tracey's song "Ladbroke Grove" initially debuted at number 48 on the UK Singles Chart in February 2019, then eventually peaked at number three in October 2019 following its release as a single. In September 2019, the British Phonographic Industry certified the song as platinum for exceeding chart sales of 600,000. It was one of the best-selling songs of 2019.

Other hits in the 2010s include Toddla T's "Take It Back", All About She's "Higher (Free)", Naughty Boy's "La La La", Shift K3Y's "Touch", Chase & Status' "Blk & Blu", M.O's "Dance On My Own", Disclosure's "Omen" and Craig David's "When the Bassline Drops" and "One More Time".

2020s
The 2020s saw new releases such as "West Ten" by AJ Tracey and Mabel, "Don't Play" by Anne-Marie, KSI and Digital Farm Animals, "Just for Me", "Pain" (which interpolates Sweet Female Attitude's "Flowers") and "Where You Are" by PinkPantheress, "Grown Flex" by Chip and Bugzy Malone, and "House & Garage" by Morrisson and Aitch, all of which charted in the UK. Kurupt FM released their debut album The Greatest Hits (Part 1) which charted at No. 8 on the UK Albums Chart. The album includes appearances by Craig David (who features on lead single "Summertime"), Mist, Jaykae, D Double E, MC Creed, Big Narstie and General Levy.

Genres evolved from garage

Dubstep
The dark garage sound that was being produced by the likes of Wookie, Zed Bias, Shy Cookie, El-B and Artwork (of DND) in the late 1990s would set the groundwork for both grime and dubstep. Developing in parallel to grime, dubstep would take a mostly instrumental stripped down form of dark garage and with it bring in production values and influences from dub reggae.

UK funky
Some UK garage/dubstep/grime/bassline producers have moved to a different sound called UK funky, which takes production values from many different shades of soulful house music with elements of UK garage and blends them at a standard house music tempo, and soca with tribal style percussion from afrobeat.

Future garage
A contemporary offshoot of dubstep heavily influenced by UK garage is future garage.

See also
 List of UK garage artists
 List of UK garage songs

References

External links
 UK Garage History & Family Tree Music Is My Sanctuary

 
Electronic dance music genres
Black British music
English styles of music
1990s in music
2000s in music
20th-century music genres
21st-century music genres